Àngel "Pichi" Alonso Herrera (born 17 December 1954) is a Spanish retired football striker and manager.

A player with a prolific scoring rate, though he never won the Pichichi Trophy, he represented, amongst others, both Barcelona major clubs during his career. He amassed La Liga totals of 261 games and 107 goals over the course of 11 seasons and won five major titles, all with FC Barcelona.

Playing career
Born in Benicarló, Castellón, Valencian Community, Alonso made his professional debut with local club CD Castellón in the second division, in 1975. Two years later he moved to Real Zaragoza, playing 33 La Liga matches in every season he remained there and never netting less than 15 goals; in his debut year, he scored five in an 8–1 rout of RCD Español.

For the 1982–83 campaign, Alonso moved to FC Barcelona, being used frequently in his first year but losing his importance after the purchase of Scotland's Steve Archibald, and never regaining it again. Still, he scored three goals against IFK Göteborg in the 1986 European Cup semi-finals, allowing the Catalans to reach the final of the competition against FC Steaua București in Seville, where he came on as a substitute in extra time, in an eventual penalty shootout loss; he was one of four players that had his attempt saved by opposing goalkeeper Helmuth Duckadam.

Alonso regained his scoring prowess at Barça neighbours Espanyol, helping the side finish third in his first season with 17 goals. In 1987–88 another penalty shootout defeat occurred, now in the UEFA Cup against Bayer 04 Leverkusen. He retired the following year at the age of 35, having won three caps for the Spain national team – his debut came on 21 December 1978 in a 0–1 friendly loss with Italy, in Rome.

Coaching career
Alonso started his manager career as assistant to former Barcelona teammate Víctor Muñoz, at RCD Mallorca. He then coached the autonomous team of Catalonia for several years, while also working as a pundit for Televisió de Catalunya.

In 2006, Alonso had a brief managerial spell at Ukraine's FC Metalurh Donetsk.

Honours
Zaragoza
Segunda División: 1977–78

Barcelona
La Liga: 1984–85
Copa del Rey: 1982–83
Supercopa de España: 1983
Copa de la Liga: 1983
European Cup: Runner-up 1985–86

Español
UEFA Cup: Runner-up 1987–88

References

External links

1954 births
Living people
People from Baix Maestrat
Sportspeople from the Province of Castellón
Spanish footballers
Footballers from the Valencian Community
Association football forwards
La Liga players
Segunda División players
CD Castellón footballers
Real Zaragoza players
FC Barcelona players
RCD Espanyol footballers
Spain under-23 international footballers
Spain B international footballers
Spain international footballers
Spanish football managers
Segunda División managers
UE Figueres managers
Ukrainian Premier League managers
FC Metalurh Donetsk managers
Spanish expatriate football managers
Expatriate football managers in Ukraine
Spanish expatriate sportspeople in Ukraine
Spanish television presenters